Hagen Jarrell Danner (born September 30, 1998) is an American professional baseball pitcher in the Toronto Blue Jays organization. He is ranked 17th on Major League Baseball's 2022 Top 30 Blue Jays prospects list.

Amateur career
In 2011, Danner played for Ocean View Little League, the team representing his hometown of Huntington Beach, California in the Little League World Series. Ocean View defeated the team from Hamamatsu, Japan, by a score of 2–1 to win the Little League World Series Championship. Danner batted .500 in the tournament, and hit a game-tying solo home run in the championship game. On the mound, he earned two wins and struck out 17 batters in 8 innings. Danner later attended Huntington Beach High School, where he played both catcher and pitcher. In his senior season, he hit .350 with 12 home runs and 40 runs batted in (RBI), and went 11–1 with a 1.22 earned run average (ERA) and 92 strikeouts in 63 innings pitched, en route to being named California's high school player of the year by the Los Angeles Times and the Orange County Register. He committed to play college baseball for the UCLA Bruins.

Professional career
Danner was considered a top prospect at both pitcher and catcher heading into the 2017 Major League Baseball draft. He was selected as a catcher in the second round, 61st overall, by the Toronto Blue Jays. On June 25, Danner signed for a $1.5 million bonus, and was assigned to the Gulf Coast League Blue Jays on June 28. He appeared in 34 games, and hit .160 with two home runs and 20 RBI.

In 2018, Danner played with the Rookie Advanced Bluefield Blue Jays, where he hit .279 with two home runs and 19 RBI in 32 games, and in 2019, he played for the Class-A Lansing Lugnuts, batting .170 with 12 home runs and 33 RBI over eighty games. 

Danner did not play in a game in 2020 due to the cancellation of the minor league season because of the COVID-19 pandemic. In 2021, Danner moved to the mound, appearing in 25 games for the Vancouver Canadians of the Northwest League. In 35 innings, he posted a 2–1 win–loss record, 2.02 ERA, and 42 strikeouts. 

On November 19, 2021, Toronto added Danner to the 40-man roster to protect him from the Rule 5 draft.

Danner began the 2022 season with the Double-A New Hampshire Fisher Cats. Danner was optioned to the Triple-A Buffalo Bisons to begin the 2023 season.

References

External links

1998 births
Living people
Baseball catchers
Baseball players from California
Bluefield Blue Jays players
Gulf Coast Blue Jays players
Lansing Lugnuts players
New Hampshire Fisher Cats players
Sportspeople from Huntington Beach, California
Vancouver Canadians players